This is a summary of 1964 in music in the United Kingdom, including the official charts from that year.

Events
1 January – Top of the Pops, the BBC's long-running weekly pop music show, is broadcast for the first time.
7 February – The Beatles arrive in the United States and are greeted by thousands of screaming fans at New York's Kennedy Airport.
9 February – The Beatles perform on The Ed Sullivan Show; their appearance breaks US television ratings records.
28 February – Peter and Gordon release their first single, "A World Without Love", a Paul McCartney song that McCartney had decided was "not good enough" for The Beatles.  The song ultimately tops the charts in both the UK and the USA.
12 March - in Moscow, Benjamin Britten conducts the premiere of his Symphony for Cello and Orchestra with soloist Mstislav Rostropovich and the Moscow Philharmonic Orchestra.
14 March – Billboard Magazine reports that sales of Beatles records make up 60% of the entire singles market.
20 March - Britten's opera Peter Grimes receives its first performance in the USSR, conducted in Leningrad by Djemal Dalgat.
21 March – "I Love the Little Things", sung by Matt Monro, the UK's entry in the Eurovision Song Contest, finishes in second place, beaten by Italy's Non ho l'età, sung by 16-year-old Gigliola Cinquetti.
24 March – John Lennon's first book, In His Own Write is published.
27 March – The Beatles occupy the top six spots on the Australian pop chart.
28 March – Wax likenesses of The Beatles are put on display in London's Madame Tussauds Wax Museum. The Beatles are the first pop stars to be displayed at the museum.
April – Drummer Keith Moon joins The Who.
4 April – The Beatles occupy all five top positions on Billboard's Hot 100 with their singles "Can't Buy Me Love", "Twist and Shout", "She Loves You", "I Want to Hold Your Hand", and "Please Please Me".
11 April – The Beatles hold 14 positions on the Billboard Hot 100 chart. Previously, the highest number of concurrent singles by one artist on the Hot 100 was nine by Elvis Presley, December 19, 1956.
16 April – The Rolling Stones release their eponymous début album.
2 May – In the United States, The Beatles' Second Album climbs to the #1 spot on the LP charts in only its second week of release.
27 May – Pirate radio station Radio Sutch begins broadcasting from Shivering Sands Army Fort in the Thames Estuary.
June – During a performance at the Railway, Pete Townshend of The Who accidentally broke the head of his guitar on the low ceiling above the stage. This incident marks the start of auto-destructive art by destroying guitars and drums on stage.
5 June – The Rolling Stones start their first US tour.
3 July – With their new manager Peter Meaden, The Who release their first single "Zoot Suit"/"I'm the Face" under the name The High Numbers in an attempt to appeal to a mod audience. It failed to reach the top 50 and the band reverted to calling themselves the Who.
6 July – The Beatles' first film, A Hard Day's Night, is released.
3 September – Priaulx Rainier's Cello Concerto is given its première at The Proms by Jacqueline du Pré and the BBC Symphony Orchestra under Norman Del Mar.
19 September – The programme for the Last Night of the Proms includes Alan Rawsthorne's Piano Concerto no 1, played by Malcolm Binns.
24 October – The Rolling Stones start their second US tour.
25 October – The Rolling Stones perform on The Ed Sullivan Show for the first time.
7 December – George Harrison's new publishing company, Mornyork Ltd, changes its name to Harrisongs.
December - Sir John Barbirolli records Elgar's The Dream of Gerontius with Janet Baker as the Angel.  The first stereophonic recording of the work, it has remained in the catalogues continuously since its first release.

Charts
See List of UK Singles Chart number ones of 1964

Classical music

New works
William Alwyn – Concerto Grosso No. 3
Malcolm Arnold
Pieces (5), for violin and piano, Op. 84
Sinfonietta No. 3, for orchestra, Op. 81
A Sunshine Overture, for orchestra, Op. 83
Water Music, for winds and percussion, Op. 82
Harrison Birtwistle
Entr’actes and Sappho Fragments, for soprano, flute, oboe, violin, viola, harp, and percussion
Three Movements with Fanfares, for chamber orchestra
Peter Maxwell Davies
Little Pieces (5), for piano
Second Fantasia on John Taverner's In Nomine, for orchestra
Shakespeare Music, for 11 instruments

Opera
Benjamin Britten – 
Billy Budd (revised version)
Curlew River

Film and Incidental music
John Barry – 
Goldfinger directed by Guy Hamilton, starring Sean Connery.
Zulu, starring Stanley Baker.
Ron Goodwin – 633 Squadron.
David Lee – The Masque of the Red Death directed by Roger Corman, starring Vincent Price.

Musical theatre
 She Loves Me – London production opens at the Lyric Theatre on 29 April and runs for 189 performances
 Maggie May London production opens at the Adelphi Theatre on 22 September and runs for 501 performances
 Robert and Elizabeth – London production opens at the Lyric Theatre on 20 October and runs for 948 performances
 Little Me, the musical – London production opens at the Cambridge Theatre on 18 November and runs for 334 performances
 Salad Days (Julian Slade) – London revival

Musical films
A Hard Day's Night
Wonderful Life

Births
9 January – Phil Hartnoll, musician and songwriter (Orbital)
17 January - Andy Rourke, bassist (The Smiths)
4 February – Ian Clarke, flautist and composer
14 February – Rob "The Bass Thing" Jones, musician (d. 1993)
18 February
Paul Hanley, drummer and songwriter (The Fall and Tom Hingley and the Lovers)
Tommy Scott, singer (Space)
20 February – Iain Ballamy, composer and saxophonist
11 March – Shane Richie, actor, comedian and singer
26 March – Gary Coupland, Scottish musician (The Singing Kettle)
25 April – Andy Bell, singer and songwriter (Erasure)
8 May  - Dave Rowntree, drummer (Blur)
14 May – Shelley Preston, singer with Bucks Fizz
25 June – Gavin Greenaway, composer and conductor, son of Roger Greenaway
28 June – Steve Williamson, saxophonist and composer (Jazz Warriors)
29 June – Stedman Pearson, R&B singer (Five Star)
26 September – Nicki French, singer
7 October – Sam Brown, singer, daughter of singers Joe Brown and Vicki Brown
18 December - Robson Green, actor and singer
25 December – Ian Bostridge, operatic and concert tenor
date unknown – Nitin Sawhney, musician, producer and composer

Deaths
7 January – Cyril Davies, harmonica player (born 1932; endocarditis)
19 May – Lawrence Wright, composer and music publisher (born 1888)
2 June – Phyllis Dixey, singer, dancer and impresario (born 1914)
28 September – George Dyson, English composer (born 1883)
13 October – Francis Toye, music critic (born 1883)
9 December – Edith Sitwell, poet and collaborator of William Walton (born 1887)
"Date unknown" – Richard Hayward, actor, writer and musician (born 1892)

See also
 1964 in British radio
 1964 in British television
 1964 in the United Kingdom
 List of British films of 1964

References

 
British Music, 1964 In
British music by year